Neptis nysiades, the variable sailer, is a butterfly in the family Nymphalidae. It is found in Senegal, Guinea-Bissau, Sierra Leone, Liberia, Ghana, Togo, Nigeria, Cameroon, the Republic of the Congo, Angola and Zambia. The habitat consists of forests, including riparian forests.

The larvae feed on Paullinia pinnata.

References

Butterflies described in 1868
nysiades
Butterflies of Africa
Taxa named by William Chapman Hewitson